Helen Lawrence may refer to:

Helen Lawrence (actress) in Murder in Harlem
Helen Lawrence (opera singer) 
Helen Lawrence (triathlete), see 2005 ITU Triathlon World Championships
fictional characters
Helen Graham (The Tenant of Wildfell Hall), character in The Tenant of Wildfell Hall
Helen Lawrence, character in Helen's Babies (film)
creative works
Helen Lawrence, a play by Vancouver artist Stan Douglas